Richard Gomer Berry, 3rd Viscount Kemsley (born 17 April 1951), is a British peer.

Biography
Berry was born on 17 April 1951, the only son of Major Hon. Denis Gomer Berry and his second wife, Pamela Wellesley. Berry's paternal grandfather was Gomer Berry, 1st Viscount Kemsley. His maternal grandfather was Captain Lord Richard Wellesley, second son of Arthur Wellesley, 4th Duke of Wellington.

Berry was educated at Eton College. He succeeded to the viscountcy and to the subsidiary barony and baronetcy on 28 February 1999 on the death of his uncle, Lionel Berry, 2nd Viscount Kemsley.

Marriages and family
Berry married firstly Tana-Marie Lester, daughter of Clive William Lester, in 1981. There were no children of this marriage. They were divorced in 1988.

Berry married secondly Elizabeth Jane Barker, daughter of Dennis Norman Barker, on 17 September 1994. They have two children:

 Hon. Luke Gomer Berry (born 2 February 1998), heir apparent
 Hon. Jessamine Eleanor Berry (born 26 July 1999)

References

1951 births
Living people
People educated at Eton College
Viscounts in the Peerage of the United Kingdom
Richard Berry

Kemsley